George Robert Allen (April 4, 1944 – May 2, 1987) was an American football defensive tackle in the American Football League (AFL) for the Houston Oilers. He played college football at West Texas State University.

Early years
Allen attended Mary C. Womack High School. He accepted a football scholarship from West Texas State University.

Professional career
Allen was selected by the Houston Oilers in the fourth round (28th overall) of the 1966 AFL Draft. He was also selected by the Dallas Cowboys in the 17th round (250th overall) of the 1966 NFL Draft. He chose to sign with the Oilers in the American Football League.

As a rookie, he played in 9 game at offensive tackle. In 1967, he was converted into a defensive tackle during training camp. He spent the year on the taxi squad.

On July 28, 1968, he was traded to the Oakland Raiders in exchange for a future draft choice (not exercised). He was released before the start of the season.

References

External links
NFL Stats

1944 births
1987 deaths
People from Longview, Texas
Players of American football from Texas
American football defensive tackles
West Texas A&M Buffaloes football players
Houston Oilers players
American Football League players